Elections to the General Council were held in French Dahomey on 15 December 1946 and 5 January 1947. The result was a victory for the Dahomeyan Progressive Union, which won 20 of the 30 seats.

Electoral system
The General Council (Conseil Général) was established as part of the constitutional reforms that created the French Fourth Republic. It had 30 seats, with 12 members elected by the first electoral college and 18 by the second electoral college.

Results

Elected members included:

Cyrille Aguessy
Justin Ahomadégbé-Tomêtin (African People's Bloc)
Michel Ahouanmènou (Dahomeyan Progressive Union)
Albert Akindès (Dahomeyan Progressive Union)
Sourou-Migan Apithy (Dahomeyan Progressive Union)
Tahirou Congacou (Dahomeyan Progressive Union)
Francis Covi
Adrien Degbey (Dahomeyan Progressive Union)
Hubert Maga (Dahomeyan Progressive Union)
Émile Poisson (African People's Bloc)

References

Dahomey
1946 in French Dahomey
Dahomey
1947 in French Dahomey
Elections in Benin
Election and referendum articles with incomplete results